Isetnofret (or Isis-nofret or Isitnofret) (Ancient Egyptian: "the beautiful Isis") was one of the Great Royal Wives of Pharaoh Ramesses II and was the mother of his successor, Merneptah. She was one of the most prominent of the royal wives, along with Nefertari, and was the chief queen after Nefertari's death (around the 24th year of the pharaoh's reign).

Family
The parents of Isetnofret are not known. She must have married Ramesses II even before he came to the throne as her eldest children already appear in scenes from the time of Seti I. She had at least three sons and one daughter. Her children include:
 Prince Ramesses, Crown Prince from Year 25 to 50 of Ramesses II
 Princess-Queen Bintanath, firstborn daughter and later wife of Ramesses
 Prince Khaemwaset, High Priest of Ptah. Crown Prince from Year 50 to 55 of Ramesses II
 Pharaoh Merneptah, Ramesses' 13th son and ultimate successor (he outlived the first 12 princes)
 Princess Isetnofret (?), possible wife of Merenptah as Isetnofret II

Prince Sethi and Princess Nebettawy have been suggested as further children of Isetnofret, but they are more likely to be the children of Nefertari (or even some other mother).

Titles
Queen Isetnofret's titles include: Hereditary Princess (iryt-p`t), Great of Praises (wrt-hzwt), King’s Mother (mwt-niswt), Mistress of the entire Two Lands (hnwt-t3wy-tm), King’s Wife (hmt-nisw), Great King’s Wife (hmt-niswt-wrt)

Life
Isetnofret is known from several inscriptions and small statues. She is not well attested before year 25 of Ramesses II. Most of the items and scenes mentioning Queen Isetnofret seem to be associated with her sons Ramesses, Khaemwaset and Merenptah. 
 Isetnofret is shown on a family stela from Aswan. The upper register shows Ramesses II, Isetnofret and Khaemwaset before the god Khnum. The lower register shows Prince Ramesses, Merneptah and Princess Queen Bintanath.
 A family stela from the Speos at West Silsila shows Ramesses II, Isetnofret and Bintanath with a much smaller Khaemwaset before the gods Ptah and Nefertem. The lower register shows Prince Ramesses and Prince (later Pharaoh) Merenptah.
 A Statue with Prince's Figure (Brussels E.7500). Her son is named on the statue: the Sem-Priest and King's Son Khaemwaset.
 A Statue group with Sons (Louvre 2272): A "hetep-di-nesu" offering for the King's Son, Sem priest of Ptah, Khaemwaset and the royal scribe, Generalissimo and King's Son Ramesses. The text mentions Queen Isetnofret (the princes' mother).
 The Head of a Statue (Brussels E.5924): On right shoulder the name of Isetnofret appears.
 A naophorous Statue of Prince Khaemwaset mentions his mother. On the dorsal pillar it reads: "Iunmutef-priest, born of the Great Royal Wife Isetnofret, the Sem-priest of Ptah Khaemwaset."
 Relief for offering for Prince Khaemwaset  in Horemheb's Speos. The text above the prince reads: "Sitting at table, making purification with natron and reading out the (funerary) menu, every good offering, for the King's Son of Usermaatre Setepenre, born of the Great Royal Wife, Isetnofret, the Sem-priest Khaemwaset."
 Shabtis from Middle cemetery of Abydos: One of these has a cartouche of Queen Isetnofret.
 West Silsila: Rock shrine of Merneptah. A scene depicts Ramesses II, Queen Isetnofret with sistra before Taweret (as a hippopotamus), Thoth and Nut.

A daughter of her son Khaemwaset (sometimes called Isetnofret III) was named after her. It is possible that this Isetnofret was Merenptah's wife, not her aunt Isetnofret II. A possible daughter of Merneptah also bears this name.

Notes

13th-century BC Egyptian women
Wives of Ramesses II
Princesses of the Nineteenth Dynasty of Egypt